Pierre le Chef is... Out to Lunch is a video game that was released for the Game Boy and SNES in 1993 by Mindscape. It is a side-scrolling platform game about a French chef trying to collect ingredients for his dishes by going to different countries to catch them as they have escaped. Ports for the Amiga and Amiga CD32 were released in 1994.

Plot
Pierre le Chef is touring the world preparing his dishes, but his ingredients have escaped and he must capture them. Pierre must watch out for bacteria, insects, and his arch-rival, Le Chef Noir. Noir, an evil chef jealous of Pierre's success, wants to ruin his career by releasing all of his gathered ingredients.

Gameplay

There is a single-player mode and a two-player alternating mode. In either mode, Pierre le Chef is the playable character. The objective is to capture a set number of ingredients before time runs out. Ingredients must be caught in a net and emptied into the level's cage. However, at every level, the player must first find the net before they can catch anything. Once the ingredients are placed in the cage, a door to the next level will appear somewhere in the stage. Along the way, the player will encounter germs and bacteria which, if the player gets touched by, loses a life. The bacteria can also turn the ingredients into hostile enemies against Pierre when they touch them. The player must also be wary of Chef le Noir, who will appear in certain levels to hinder the player's progress. Additionally, the player can pick up weapons like flour bags or hot sauce which can be used to stun ingredients and bacteria. The player must guide Pierre le Chef through Switzerland, Greece, Jamaica (known in the game as the West Indies), Mexico, China and then France. Each country has 8 levels that the player has to navigate through. At the end of every country, the player plays a bonus game where they can collect bonus points for extra lives.

Once the player loses all lives or completes the game, the player is given a final score based on how many points the player got throughout the game and that score is put on the high-score list.

Reception 
GameRankings gave the game 59.5%.

References

1993 video games
Platform games
Amiga games
Amiga CD32 games
Game Boy games
Super Nintendo Entertainment System games
Video games about food and drink
Video games scored by Mark Knight
Video games about microbes
Video games developed in the United Kingdom
Video games set in China
Video games set in France
Video games set in Greece
Video games set in Jamaica
Video games set in Mexico
Video games set in Switzerland
Mindscape games